Köinge may refer to the following places in Sweden:

 Köinge, Falkenberg Municipality, a village
 Köinge, Hörby Municipality, a village in Hörby Municipality